Rosario de Lerma is a town in the center of the province of Salta, Argentina.

Overview
It lies by the Rosario River, 35 km southwest from the provincial capital Salta and northwest of the Cabra Corral Dam.

External links

 
 Rosario de Lerma at the Chamber of Deputies of Salta.

Populated places in Salta Province